Reynolds House is a historic home located at Poughkeepsie, Dutchess County, New York.  It was built about 1895 and is a -story Shingle Style dwelling.  The raised basement and first stories are of cobblestone and the second and third stories are shingled.  It features a front porch with Tuscan order columns.

It was added to the National Register of Historic Places in 1982.

References

Houses on the National Register of Historic Places in New York (state)
Shingle Style architecture in New York (state)
Houses completed in 1895
Houses in Poughkeepsie, New York
National Register of Historic Places in Poughkeepsie, New York